Martijn Meeuwis (born July 14, 1982 in Moergestel) is a Dutch baseball player who currently plays for Neptunus and the Dutch national team.

Meeuwis debuted with the Twins Sport Club in 1999 as a teenager but did not return to the Hoofdklasse again until 2004, when he became a full-time player. When the Twins were relegated, Meeuwis moved to HCAW. In 2005, he hit .184/.266/.233 as a regular outfielder. In 2006, he was the club's regular center fielder, though he also filled in at second base. He hit .304/.377/.402 and led the league in triples (5). In 2007, Meeuwis really blossomed after joining DOOR Neptunus. He hit .301/.394/.500 with 37 RBI in 39 games while returning to catcher, his original position. He threw out 19 of 35 would-be base-stealers. He was 7th in 2007 Hoofdklasse in batting average, third in home runs (6) and second in RBI (six behind leader Tjerk Smeets). He was named as one of the three finalists for the league MVP award alongside Fausto Álvarez and Danny Rombley; Álvarez won.

Meeuwis joined the Dutch national team when Johnny Balentina, another C-OF, was injured. He was part of the team's historic first visit to the United States, which included a win over the college edition of Team USA. He played also in the 2007 World Port Tournament, going 1 for 6. Balentina was back with the team for the 2007 European Championship but Meeuwis replaced him once more for the 2007 Baseball World Cup. He was 3 for 10 with 2 walks and a double in the World Cup that year, helping fill in for CF Roger Bernadina. He had a key role in the Dutch win over host Chinese Taipei in the quarterfinals. En-Yu Lin had retired 13 batters in a row and held a 2-0 lead when Meeuwis walked and came around to score on a hit by Reily Legito. Gregory Halman later replaced Meeuwis in center in that game. Meeuwis hit .231/.375/.231 in the 2008 European Cup in Regensburg.

Meeuwis was selected by coach Robert Eenhoorn, in the team that represents the Netherlands at the 2008 Summer Olympics in Beijing.

External links
Meeuwis's profile at honkbalsite.com

References

1982 births
Living people
Dutch baseball players
Olympic baseball players of the Netherlands
Baseball players at the 2008 Summer Olympics
People from Oisterwijk
HCAW players
DOOR Neptunus players
Sportspeople from North Brabant